Rock frog may refer to:

 Barahona rock frog (Eleutherodactylus alcoae), a frog in the family Leptodactylidae found in the Dominican Republic and Haiti
 Copland's rock frog (Litoria coplandi), a frog in the family Hylidae endemic to Australia
 Doi Inthanon rock frog (Amolops archotaphus or Rana archotaphus), a frog in the family Ranidae found in Laos, Thailand, and possibly Vietnam
 Kirtisinghe's rock frog (Nannophrys marmorata), a frog in the family Dicroglossidae endemic to Sri Lanka
 Masked rock frog (Litoria personata), a frog in the family Hylidae endemic to Australia
 Puerto Rican rock frog (Eleutherodactylus cooki), a frog in the family Leptodactylidae found in Puerto Rico
 Rock haunting frog (Cophixalus saxatilis), a frog in the family Microhylidae endemic to Australia
 Sri Lanka rock frog (Nannophrys ceylonensis), a frog in the family Dicroglossidae endemic to Sri Lanka

See also

 Frog Rock (disambiguation)

Animal common name disambiguation pages